B-Sides and Seasides is a 2012 B-side compilation album by the American group The Narrative, released on 4 April and produced by Bryan Russell at Red Wire Audio.

Background 
In 2012 the Narrative started to record their second full-length album in New York and released the b-side compilation, with another donation packages sold through their official website, to fund the album production. The compilation include acoustics, alternate versions of the songs from The Narrative and Just Say Yes. It includes two new songs "Hallelujah" and "Make It Right" (from the touring EP Kickstarter and Nothing Without You) and covers of Radiohead's "Karma Police" and of Brand New's "Tautou", where the band has created an extended version for the song.

The cover picture was taken by Hilary J. Corts on 2011 in the city of Phoenix, Arizona.

Track listing

Personnel

The Narrative 
 Suzie Zeldin - Vocals, keys
 Jesse Gabriel - Vocals, guitar

Additional personnel 
 Bryan Russell - Producer
 Hilary J. Corts - Album Cover

Critical response 
"Seanholio" from Cooltry wrote: "I usually wouldn’t review a rarities/b sides album BUT The Narrative are a special case. What other band would take the time out of their busy schedule to video chat with not just 1 but over 40 of their fans who helped fund their tour. During this video chat Vocalist/Keys player Suzie Zeldin mentioned that whilst they are working hard on their follow up to their debut self titled album they didn’t realize how this album is more than just a b sides album. It has some brand new songs, it has alternate versions and it has covers. It is safe to say that this is a decent and proper release for 2012".

Notes 

B-side compilation albums
The Narrative albums
2012 albums